"There's Nothing I Can Say" is a song written by Christian Sarrel and Al Stillman and performed by Rick Nelson. The song reached #18 on the adult contemporary chart and #47 on the Billboard Hot 100 in 1964.  The single's B-side, "Lonely Corner", reached #113 on the Billboard chart.

The song was produced and arranged by Jimmie Haskell.

References

1964 songs
1964 singles
Ricky Nelson songs
Decca Records singles
Songs with lyrics by Al Stillman